Johanna Margareta Larsson (born 1 January 1972 in Leksberg, Västra Götaland) is a former Swedish Olympic backstroke swimmer. She competed in the 1988 Summer Olympics, where she swum the 100 m backstroke, 200 m backstroke and the 4×100 m medley relay.

Clubs
Mariestads SS

References
 

1972 births
Swedish female backstroke swimmers
Living people
Swimmers at the 1988 Summer Olympics
Olympic swimmers of Sweden
Mariestads SS swimmers
Sportspeople from Västra Götaland County